Wilson Middle School can refer to:
Wilson Middle School (California), a middle school in the San Diego Unified School District
Wilson Middle School (Florida), a middle school in Tampa, Florida, part of Hillsborough County Public Schools
Wilson Middle School (Texas), a middle school in the Plano Independent School District
Wilson Middle School (Washington), a middle school in the Yakima School District
Wilson Middle School (Wisconsin), a middle school in the Appleton Area School District
Wilson Middle school (Alberta), a middle school in the Lethbridge School Division

See also
Woodrow Wilson Middle School, a historic middle school in Philadelphia, PA